Matthew Edward Fish (born November 18, 1969) is an American retired professional basketball player who played in the National Basketball Association (NBA) for the Los Angeles Clippers, Denver Nuggets, New York Knicks, Miami Heat and Washington Bullets. He played collegiately at the University of North Carolina at Wilmington and was drafted in the 1992 NBA Draft to the Golden State Warriors. 

Fish went on to earn a master's in Education and a master's in Business to go along with his BA in Communication and Special Education.  He publishes Rebound Magazine, the NBA-approved official publication of the National Basketball Retired Players Association (NBRPA),  where is he also the President of the Phoenix Chapter.  He was the first member intern for the NBRPA at the corporate level in Chicago.

Fish also played in the IBA and the CBA, where he played a major role in the 1994 CBA champions Quad City Thunder.  Fish was a CBA All-Star, All-Rookie team, and the number one center in the CBA during his career.

During his playing days, when making a hook shot, it was often called a "Fish Hook", a play on his name.

References

External links
 Career statistics - databasebasketball.com
 NBA.com profile

1969 births
Living people
American expatriate basketball people in Argentina
American expatriate basketball people in France
American expatriate basketball people in Poland
American expatriate basketball people in Portugal
American men's basketball players
Basketball players from Iowa
BCM Gravelines players
Centers (basketball)
Denver Nuggets players
FC Porto basketball players
Fort Wayne Fury players
Golden State Warriors draft picks
Grand Rapids Hoops players
La Crosse Bobcats players
Los Angeles Clippers players
Miami Heat players
New York Knicks players
Omaha Racers players
People from Washington, Iowa
Quad City Thunder players
San Diego Stingrays players
UNC Wilmington Seahawks men's basketball players
Washington Bullets players
Yakima Sun Kings players
United States Basketball League players
Club Atlético Peñarol basketball players
Polonia Warszawa (basketball) players